Charles Edward Rhetts (May 21, 1910November 14, 1971) was an American diplomat.

Early life
Rhetts was born in Columbus, Indiana on May 21, 1910.

Education
Rhetts graduated from Dartmouth College and Harvard Law School.

Career
In 1934, after graduating, he worked in Washington D.C. with New Deal agencies. In 1945, Rhetts served as acting assistant Attorney General. Rhetts also practiced private law in Washington D.C., where he represented John S. Service.

Diplomatic career

Rhetts was appointed by President John F. Kennedy to the position of United States Ambassador to Liberia on July 5, 1962. The presentation of his credentials occurred on August 7, 1962. He remained in this position until September 30, 1964.

Personal life
Rhetts was married to Ruth Fisher. Together they had three children.

Death
On November 14, 1971, Rhetts died during a vacation in London, England of a heart attack.

References

1910 births
1971 deaths
Dartmouth College alumni
Harvard Law School alumni
People from Columbus, Indiana
Ambassadors of the United States to Liberia
20th-century American lawyers
20th-century American diplomats